Rozell Manely Brown (born October 6, 1964) is an American beatboxer and rapper, formerly a member of the Roots.

Rahzel is known for an ability to sing or rap while simultaneously beatboxing, as evidenced in his performances of "Iron Man" and his signature song "If Your Mother Only Knew", a hidden track on Make the Music 2000. His talents are showcased in various solo projects as well as on Ben Harper's 2000 single "Steal My Kisses." He also provided his own voice on video games SSX and SSX Tricky. Rahzel was featured on the album True Love by Toots and the Maytals, which won the Grammy Award in 2004 for Best Reggae Album, and showcased many notable musicians.

Discography

Studio albums
 1999:  Make the Music 2000
 2004:  Rahzel's Greatest Knock Outs

Guest appearances

Filmography 
 2001: Brooklyn Babylon
 2009: The Magnificent Cooly T
 2012: Dora's Easter Adventure (Fiesta Trio)

Awards
Rahzel received the Lifetime Achievement Award at the 2017 American Beatbox Championships for his revolutionary contributions to the industry. Doug E. Fresh presented the award to Rahzel. At the 2022 American Beatbox Championships, Rahzel actually presented the same award to Tara Hall, the wife of late Biz Markie who accepted the award on his behalf.

References

External links
 Rahzel interviewed
 Rahzel Internet Radio Interview
 Discogs page
 Rahzel's IBA profile

Singers from New York City
Living people
The Roots members
American beatboxers
MCA Records artists
1966 births
21st-century American singers